Jorge González Asensi (born 29 October 1998) is a Spanish footballer who currently plays as a midfielder for Louisville City FC in the USL Championship.

Career

Mercyhurst University
In 2016, González attended Mercyhurst University in Erie, Pennsylvania to play college soccer. In his freshman year he made 18 appearances, scoring 14 goals and tallying four assists, and was also named PSAC Freshman of the Year.

Southern Illinois University Edwardsville
González transferred to Southern Illinois University Edwardsville for his sophomore year in 2017, where he played for three seasons, making 50 appearances and totaling 18 goals and five assists. While with the Cougars, González was chosen as a first team All-North Region by United Soccer Coaches after earning Mid-American Conference Player of the Year honors.

Chicago FC United
While at college, González also appeared for USL League Two side Chicago FC United in 2019.

MLS SuperDraft
On 13 January 2020, González was selected 76th overall in the 2020 MLS SuperDraft by Los Angeles FC. However, he was not signed by the club.

Portland Timbers 2
On 5 March 2020, González signed with USL Championship side Portland Timbers 2. He made his professional debut on 3 August 2020, starting in a 4–0 loss to rivals Tacoma Defiance. Timbers 2 opted to stop operating following the 2020 season.

Portland Timbers
On 2 April 2021, González was signed by the Portland Timbers to a one-year contract with a club option for an additional year and loaned to Louisville City FC for the 2021 season. Following the 2021 season, Portland opted to decline their contract option on Gonzalez.

Louisville City FC
After spending the 2021 season on loan with Louisville City FC, Gonzalez signed a permanent contract with LouCity in January 2022.

References

External links 
 Jorge Gonzalez Timbers 2 bio
 

1998 births
Living people
Spanish footballers
Association football midfielders
Chicago FC United players
Expatriate soccer players in the United States
Los Angeles FC draft picks
Portland Timbers 2 players
Portland Timbers players
Louisville City FC players
SIU Edwardsville Cougars men's soccer players
Spanish expatriate footballers
Spanish expatriate sportspeople in the United States
Footballers from Valencia (city)
USL Championship players
USL League Two players
Mercyhurst Lakers men's soccer players